A regional variation generally refers to times when a radio station or television station simultaneously broadcasts different programmes, continuity or advertisements to different parts of its coverage area. This may be so as to provide programming specific to a particular region, such as local news or may be so as to allow advertisements to be targeted to a particular area.

Some regional variations are the consequence of a federal style television network or radio network where a local station is part of a larger broadcast network and broadcasts the network's programmes some of the time and its own programming the rest of the time. The latter is therefore sometimes considered a regional variation. Examples of this include the UK's ITV network throughout much of its history, and American network affiliate stations.

Regional variation is also a common term used in British television listings publications, such as magazines and newspapers, to show the different programmes broadcast in different areas of the country.

Technicalities of regional variations
Traditionally, regional variations depend on a network or service broadcasting over multiple transmitters. Typically a 'network' feed will originate from a central location, such as BBC Television Centre, and be fed to all transmitters. Local offices or regional contractors would then be said to opt out of this feed when they switch to feeding the transmitter(s) with locally originated content and to opt in when returning to a national feed. Opt-ins and opt-outs were often quite noticeable in earlier days for causing the picture distortion such as jumping and rolling as the feed was switched; such effects are still noticeable today, though less obvious.

Whilst the BBC originated its network feed from the same place (Television Centre) ITV in earlier days would generally originate its feed from the broadcaster which made the programme.

Satellite services such as Sky Digital often offer regional variations by transmitting duplicate feeds of the same station for each region traditionally covered by groups of transmitters as an arguably costly way to provide regional variations within an area covered by the same satellite. Both the BBC and ITV do this, as do Channel 4 and Channel Five for advertisements. The digital set top box will determine which version of the channel to supply based on a list of post codes corresponding to the details on the user's smart card.

Opt-out
Opt-out is a term used in broadcasting when a nation or region splits from the main national output. In the United Kingdom, BBC One Scotland, BBC One Northern Ireland and BBC One Wales often opt out of the main BBC One schedule in favour of regionally relevant programming.

In a similar manner, local television newsrooms present regional news following national news bulletins—the practice having been popularised by current affairs programmes Nationwide and Sixty Minutes—after which they would opt into the national programme again.  Opting out was also common throughout telethons, such as Children in Need, where regions separate to transmit local coverage.

Technical description
An opt-out is the process of a regional entity inserting its output into a tributary of an otherwise complete national broadcast distribution feed, creating a local variation in output.

Being a non-commercial broadcaster, the BBC has no need to play out local commercial spots, thus a regional node will typically only output programme material during the local news.  Rather than each region having to control or monitor output that is being relayed from a central source, the region will step back from the network, allowing the central source to directly feed its transmitters.  The central source is a national feed, which is complete in itself including all continuity, timing, announcement and programme elements.  The region interposes to broadcast its element locally, in place of a programme in the national feed, by bringing itself into the network (cold-opt) in preparation for the start of the regional element (warm-opt).

Within BBC English Regions, the opt-out usually takes place within equipment located within the region's own central technical area.  This is not always the case though; for instance the output from BBC Hull, which feeds the Belmont transmitter, is actually switched at BBC Leeds, and the Channel Islands opt-out occurs at Plymouth on the UK mainland, although the programme content comes from both Plymouth and Jersey.  Considerable variation can exist between the signal paths for digital (DTT and DSat) and analogue transmissions, leading to great complexity in the opt-out logic.

Commercial broadcasters such as ITV, Channel 4 (with S4C) and Channel 5 distribute their programmes to regions complete with local advertising and regional programme variations.  Regional programmes, although they may be produced in a particular region, are sent to a centralised play-out facility as contributions for insertion into the regional broadcast feed.  BBC programmes in Scotland, Wales and Northern Ireland are broadcast from their own play-out facilities in Glasgow, Cardiff and Belfast, although receiving live and recorded programmes from London they continuously monitor their own output.  Thus they do not actually "opt out".

By country

Canada 
Commercial television in Canada generally used a model similar to the U.S., with networks composed of first-party owned and operated (O&O) stations, and third-party affiliates. However, from the 1990s through the 2000s, including CTV Television and its gradual takeover by Baton Broadcasting, and Canwest's acquisition of Western International Communications to expand the Global Television Network and build a secondary television system, Canada's major commercial networks were largely consolidated under their respective conglomerate owners; CTV, Global, Citytv, TVA, and nearly all of their respective stations are owned by Bell Media, Corus Entertainment, Rogers Media, and Quebecor respectively.

The major English-language networks, including advertising-funded public network CBC Television, have largely used consistent scheduling (besides time zone variations, and adjustments to allow for simultaneous substitution of programming carried by U.S. broadcast stations available on subscription television), branding and on-air continuity, with little variation besides local newscasts and public affairs programs (for example, some CTV stations, especially in Western Canada, substitute the network's national morning show Your Morning for the local format CTV Morning Live). There are relatively few third-party affiliate stations of Canada's commercial networks; they typically follow the schedule of an O&O in a nearby major market, but with opt-outs for local newscasts and other local programming, and may also simulcast that station's newscasts in timeslots where they do not air their own (essentially acting as a third-party semi-satellite).

Corus Entertainment's private CTV affiliates substituted CTV News programs with Global News programs, and CHEX-TV-2 additionally branded as "Global Durham" despite otherwise being a CTV affiliate. CHEX-DT/Peterborough is within the range of CTV's Toronto station CFTO-DT, and both are carried on cable locally; the stations ultimately became Global stations after the affiliation expired. These stations were previously private CBC affiliates; when Hockey Night in Canada aired games regionally, CHEX aired an alternate game over CBC's Toronto station CBLT to provide an additional option for viewers where both stations were readily available.

CJON-DT has more significant variations due to having sublicensed different types of programming from Global, CTV, and Yes TV.

France 
Regional elements are inserted into the French public broadcaster France 3 (France Régions 3, or FR3 for short) by opting out from a national service broadcast from Paris.

Italy 
The Italian public television channel Rai 3 provides regional news programming, and programmes that are regionally relevant.

Philippines 
In general, the programming lineup from a television network's flagship station (usually based in Metro Manila) is simulcast almost in its entirety across that network's regional stations.  However, networks like ABS-CBN, PTV, and GMA have regional news programmes in selected parts of the country (each network decides how many different regional variations it wishes to have and which provinces constitute which viewing region).  Previously, ABS-CBN's regional stations used to feature regional programmes beyond news; however, most of them have been cancelled due to cost-cutting measures and preparations for the impending digital switchover.  Sometimes, whilst network programming is ongoing, stations may insert a ticker tape of advertisements from local/regional companies.

Sweden 
Although Sweden's public television channels - SVT1 and SVT2 - have regional variations; the actual amount of airtime allocated for regional opt-outs is very small and is only limited to news updates.  During weekday mornings from 06.00 to 09.00 local time, these regional news updates are embedded into SVT's flagship morning news programme Morgonstudion.  A longer regional news bulletin (approximately 13 minutes long) is shown at 18.30 on SVT1.  A shorter five-minute update follows at 19.55 after Rapport SVT1.  A final news update is shown at 21.45 after the main Aktuellt newscast on SVT2.  SVT does not have opt-out programming on Saturdays.

United Kingdom 
The BBC has traditionally offered regional variations across many of its services. The Home Service and its successor Radio 4 provided regional variations until the early 1980s when Local Radio took over these responsibilities. BBC One and the BBC Television Service have provided variations in the English regions throughout most of their history, and continues to do so today (mainly news and current affairs programming). In Scotland, Wales and Northern Ireland, BBC One has to a large degree been operated as a separate television channel, rather than a variant on BBC One as broadcast in England. 

BBC Two has in the past broadcast variations within the English regions, though now only has variations for Wales and Northern Ireland. BBC Two Scotland was discontinued in 2019 and was succeeded in purpose by the new BBC Scotland channel—which carries a nightly lineup of programming of relevance to Scotland. The channel is still effectively a regional variation of BBC Two (albeit operating in parallel with the English regions' version—which replaced BBC Two Scotland on Freeview—rather than as a substitute of it), as it simulcasts BBC Two outside of its main broadcast hours. BBC Choice also briefly had regional variations for these areas.

ITV was originally established as a network of some 14 separate companies, each designated a region of coverage (see History of ITV). Each company provided a mixture of local programming for its own coverage area, as well as airing nationwide networked programmes (usually produced by one of the contractors). ITV has traditionally included more regional variations than the BBC, though since consolidation and majority ownership by ITV plc regional variations on the network are far fewer which in England consists only of regional news and a monthly political discussion programme, and often are no more than the minimum requirements as set by Ofcom.

Channel 4 and Channel 5 provide no regional variations for programming or continuity, but do sell localized advertising. A notable exception was S4C, a channel in Wales which broadcast in place of Channel 4, and primarily broadcast Welsh-language programming of interest to the local audience, as well as programming acquired from Channel 4 (but not always in pattern). Although S4C was a de facto regional variation of Channel 4, it was a separate channel in its own right. During the transition to digital television, Channel 4 became available over-the-air in Wales on Freeview alongside S4C, which subsequently provided an alternate feed that only carried Welsh programming.

Sky News and Sky1 also provide a variant of their stations for the Republic of Ireland, although specific Sky News coverage for the Republic of Ireland is extremely limited, due in part to the channel with Irish content closing on 3 November 2006, and Sky1's variant is purely an advertising opt-out.

United States 
U.S. broadcast television is heavily regionalised to an extent due to the business model of its major commercial networks, which enter into agreements with stations in each media market to carry their national programming, similarly to a franchise. As the FCC enforces a limit on the market share of broadcasters, networks typically have owned and operated (O&O) stations only in major and key markets, and rely on affiliates to reach the remainder of the country.

Outside of network programming (which usually consists of two or more hours of prime time programmes per-night at a minimum, and may also include national news, sports and daytime programmes), the scheduling of each station's programming varies, and usually consists of local newscasts, programmes acquired from the syndication market, and brokered programming (including infomercials, more often in off-peak hours). Similarities may still exist in the scheduling of syndicated programmes between markets, based on factors such as "recommended" timeslots suggested by a programme's distributor, and broadcasters acquiring a particular programme for all of their stations in a group deal. Due to differing market dynamics, Spanish-language networks such as Telemundo and Univision, as well as specialty networks designed to be carried on digital subchannels, have a centralised network schedule with opt-out periods for local programs and other regulatory obligations not fulfilled by national programming.

Affiliates may, from time to time, opt out of network programs to air special programming of local interest (such as coverage of sports or local celebrations); affiliation contracts typically contain restrictions on how often this can be done, and may require the displaced programming to be preempted to either a sister station, digital subchannel, or different timeslot (such as during the late-night hours or on a different night) as compensation. In the past, Westinghouse Broadcasting was known for pre-empting network programming on its stations for its own in-house programming; when reaching a major affiliation deal with CBS in 1994 (as part of a larger re-alignment of broadcast television triggered by Fox's acquisition of New World Communications), the company agreed to cease this practice and carry all CBS network programming in-pattern with no preemptions (Westinghouse would later acquire CBS outright). 

In certain highly-publicised cases, affiliates have opted out of network programmes (either individual episodes, or entire series) based on objections to their content by station management, such as due to the owner's religious values, and political reasons.

A more straightforward equivalent to a regional variation in North American broadcasting is a semi-satellite—a co-owned rebroadcaster of a television station that is used to extend its range into a different portion of a market (typically if the main signal is not strong enough to reach it), or a different one entirely, but has more variation in programming than a straight rebroadcaster. Semi-satellites typically share the majority of their programming with a parent station (which may vary to account for syndication rights), but carry a different on-air brand, and local advertising specific to the region. Some semi-satellites have dedicated news bureaus, and may opt out from the parent's station's newscasts to carry either local news segments, or dedicated local newscasts in selected time slots.

 WDAZ-TV in Grand Forks, North Dakota—a sister to WDAY-TV in Fargo. Until December 2018, it aired Grand Forks-specific evening and late-night newscasts, while otherwise simulcasting regional newscasts produced from Fargo by WDAY.
 WSAZ-TV in Huntington, West Virginia—which previously operated a retransmitter, W16CE, to improve its broadcast coverage in the state capital of Charleston, West Virginia. During this time, the stations' newscasts were divided into regional and local segments; the first half was simulcast across the stations and presented by anchors in both Huntington and Charleston via split screen. The stations then broke away for segments with stories specific to their respective city.

 In some regions, a larger-scale group of co-owned stations may be linked together to form a state network—such as the Montana Television Network (a group of CBS affiliates across Montana), NBC North Dakota, Forum Communications' ABC affiliates KBMY in Bismarck and KMCY in Minot (which are largely fed from WDAY), as well as chains of non-commercial stations (typically PBS stations).

Regional sports networks that cover large regions may similarly be carved into regional variants to account for differing broadcast rights to teams between markets. Examples include Fox Sports San Diego—spun from Fox Sports West in 2012 after it acquired rights to the San Diego Padres of Major League Baseball, and MSG Western New York—a Buffalo, New York-centric feed of the state-wide MSG Network that is co-owned by local team owner Pegula Sports and Entertainment.

Variations in image and continuity in the UK

ITV
 
Until 2002, ITV's continuity was largely separate in each region of the country, even when announcing broadcasts that were the same throughout the country. The logo of the regional contractor would typically be displayed instead of, or far more prominently than, any 'ITV' logo, before programmes and during trailers. Separate announcers would also be used.

With the consolidation of many ITV companies throughout the 1990s, continuity was often shared between regions as a cost-cutting measure, with the Granada plc companies sharing a continuity announcer (but with different logos) from the late 1990s until all ITV Plc regions shared the same continuity from 2002 onwards. UTV and STV still continue with separate continuity most of the time, with Channel Television occasionally showing its own pre-recorded continuity in place of the network ITV branded material.

BBC
 
The BBC also provided regional continuity during the 1970s, often also for nationally networked programming, but in England this ended in 1980. Regional continuity by the BBC in Northern Ireland, Scotland and Wales for BBC One and BBC Two is broadcast between 6 am and 2 am. Outside these times the channels use the main BBC One and BBC Two continuity. In England, BBC One continuity is simply referred to as BBC One on air at all times except preceding local programming where all regions except BBC London use pre-recorded announcements. BBC London uses the main BBC announcers for its local programmes. BBC Two is a single channel in England, and since 2019 in Scotland, uses national continuity at all times due to the BBC Scotland TV channel being launched.

BBC Three, BBC Four, CBBC, CBeebies, BBC News and BBC Parliament have no regional variations and therefore no regional continuity.

Regional variations in listings
Magazines and national newspapers print different editions of their TV listings for different areas – some just for the four British nations of England, Scotland, Wales and Northern Ireland, while others produce separate editions for the regions within England also. For example, the "Radio Times" produces six different editions in total (three of them in the English regions), while its oldest rival "TV Times" now produces only four; newspaper supplements are usually printed in just one edition for the whole of the UK.

A regional variations column shows programmes in areas which differ from those in the main listings columns. Generally, only programming that differs from the main schedule is listed rather than listing the entire schedule of each regional area verbatim, much of which would be identical. It is these programmes that make up regional variations. Sometimes all UK regional variations are listed, generally when only one copy of a publication is made for every area, but often only adjoining regions are listed as variations, as is the case in the "Radio Times".

In English regional and UK-wide editions, the main BBC One or ITV column shows programmes in the London region, with other regions (and nations) in the regional variations column. S4C is also often listed here. In Welsh and Scottish editions, adjoining English regions are usually listed. In Northern Ireland, some services from the Republic of Ireland are often listed as regional variations, although they are not.

See also
BBC UK regional TV on satellite
France 3 Régions
TV listings (UK)
Listings magazine
local insertion

External links
 A map of ITV Regions at itvlocal.com
 A map of BBC TV Regions in England

Notes

Television in the United Kingdom
Television terminology